Monsieur Sans-Gêne is a 1935 French romantic comedy film directed by Karl Anton and starring Fernand Gravey, Josseline Gaël and Ginette Gaubert.  The following year it was remade as an American comedy One Rainy Afternoon, released by United Artists.

Synopsis
A man creates a national scandal after he mistakenly kisses the wrong woman in a darkened cinema.

Cast
Fernand Gravey as Fernand Martin
Josseline Gaël as Monique Perrochin
Ginette Gaubert as Juliette Durand
Armand Dranem as Le souffleur
Thérèse Dorny as La féministe
 Jeanne Byrel as La gouvernante
 Charles Dechamps as Pierre Crémieux
 Jim Gérald as Monsieur Perrochin
 Nicolas Rimsky as Le musicien

References

Bibliography
Crisp, Colin. Genre, Myth and Convention in the French Cinema 1929-1939. Indiana University Press, 2002.
 Mazdon, Lucy. Encore Hollywood: Remaking French Cinema. British Film Institute, 2000.

External links

1935 romantic comedy films
French romantic comedy films
Films directed by Karl Anton
Films set in Paris
French black-and-white films
1930s French films